Axel Kicillof (born 25 September 1971) is an Argentine Peronist economist and politician who has been Governor of Buenos Aires since 2019.

Kicillof completed an ideological turn, from teaching Marxist economics to the doctrine of Perón, joined the Justicialist Party and is already vice president of the party. The governor is seen as combining academic scholarship with overwhelming charisma.

Kicillof also served as Argentina's Minister of Economy from 2013 to 2015 under the administration of President Cristina Fernández de Kirchner. Described by his biographer as “the economic guru who captivated Cristina Kirchner,” Kicillof was instrumental in the 2012 renationalization of the energy firm YPF. It was on his advice that President Fernández de Kirchner decided not to meet holdout bondholder demands to be repaid what they were owed in 2014. The decision was supported by among others the United Nations, the Organization of American States, the G-77 (133 nations), the Council on Foreign Relations, the American Bankers Association, and bondholders whose payments were stopped by the 2014 ruling.

Kicillof has been a firm believer in Keynesian economics, and an avid admirer of the Kirchners since his student days when he was a member of the pro-Kirchner youth group La Cámpora and head of the radical student group TNT. A longtime professor of Economic Sciences at the University of Buenos Aires and outspoken critic of the neo-liberal policies of the Kirchners' predecessors, he is known for his unorthodox haircut and dress code, signifying his anti-establishment views.

Early life and education
Kicillof is the second child of three siblings born to psychologist Nora Barenstein and psychoanalyst Daniel Kicillof, both non-practicing Ashkenazi Jews; Kicillof was raised in the neighborhood of Recoleta. His father committed suicide when Kicillof was 22.

From 1984 to 1989, Kicillof attended the Colegio Nacional de Buenos Aires. From 1990 to 1995, he studied at the Faculty of Economic Sciences of the University of Buenos Aires (UBA). He graduated magna cum laude, receiving a Degree in Economics with a focus on the public sector. He was the top student in his class of 122. From 1997 to 2005, he pursued graduate studies at UBA, receiving a Doctorate in Economics. His doctoral dissertation, later published as a book, was titled Génesis y estructura de la Teoría General de Lord Keynes (Genesis and Structure of the General Theory of Lord Keynes).

At university, he was a prominent student leader. He was the head of the student organization Tontos pero No Tanto (TNT, Spanish for Dummies but Not That Much) and was also a member of the Kirchnerist youth group La Cámpora, now headed by Máximo Kirchner. As a student leader he was “acclaimed by students like a rock star.” From 1989 to 2001, he was an outspoken critic of neoliberalism in Argentina.

Career

Academic work
Kicillof was an adjunct professor in the School of Economic Sciences at UBA from 1998 to 2010.

While he was a professor, Kicillof was noted for his anti-Kirchner, Keynesian writings on the website of CENDA (the Center for Argentine Development, a think tank that he headed). Some of these writings were later removed from the site.
 
In 2003, Kicillof became the first Head Teaching Assistant and, later, Regular Adjunct Professor of Economics II in the Sociology track. He also taught economics at the Escuela Superior de Comercio Carlos Pellegrini, the Universidad Nacional de Quilmes, and the Universidad Nacional de General Sarmiento.

At the postgraduate level, Kicillof was Professor of Economics in the masters and doctoral programs for Social Sciences at the Institute of Economic and Social Development at the Universidad Nacional de General Sarmiento (UNGS-IDES). In the Latin American Social Sciences Institute (FLACSO), he was the Professor of History of Economic Thought in the masters program for Public Policy for Development with Social Inclusion. Earlier, Kicillof taught economics in the masters and doctoral programs for Political Economics with the Argentinian Economy, specializing in two subjects, the History of Economic Thought and Microeconomics and Macroeconomics, Fundamental Concepts of the Political Economy. Kicillof also taught a course entitled "Differentiation of Capital in the Field of Health" in the Faculty of Economics at the University of Buenos Aires.

Since November 2010, Kicillof has been an Assistant Researcher for CONICET. At the Center of Studies for the Planning of Development (CEPLAD) at the Institute of Economics Research (University of Buenos Aires), he was appointed the Deputy Director and served from 2006 to 2010.

Other professional activities
Between 1990 and 1995, Kicillof worked in various advisory capacities for National Motor Vehicle Transport Commission (CONTA), Tintorerías Ecológicas Dolphin System, the Eduardo Sívori Museum (pro bono), Transportes Vidal S.A., SARTOR S.A., CALED S.A., Molinari S.A., Clínica Cirugía Plástica, Centro Médico Bacigaluppi, Center for Education on Sexuality Research and Therapy (CETIS), Center for Urology and Male Health (CEUSA), among other clients. He was a part-time Financial and Information Systems manager at the Center for Diagnosis and Treatment of Allergies in 1990–95. He served as Research Assistant (1993) and Junior Economist at the Inter-American Center for Macroeconomic Studies from 1994 to 1995 and concurrently served as Adviser on the National Commission for Promotion and Development of Patagonia in 1994.

In 1995–96 he served as Adviser to the Undersecretariat of Technical Administrative Coordination in the Secretariat of Social Development. In 1997, he acted as Technical Consultant to the Minister Secretary General of the Executive Branch in connection with the development of the government's social plan for 1998–2000. In 1997–1998, he was a consultant to the consulting firm M-Unit. In 1998 he was a Project Manager for AperNet. In 2009–2010, he served as CFO for Aerolíneas Argentinas in connection with the formulation of its business plan for 2011–2014. According to El País, he was one of several former TNT members who joined the management team of the newly nationalized airline.

Kicillof was appointed Deputy General Manager of Aerolíneas Argentinas in 2011. That same year he was appointed to the Board of Directors of Siderar, a steel company, on behalf of the Argentine state in return for government approval of the firm's payment of $1.5 billion in dividends (the Argentine government is a substantial minority shareholder in Siderar).

Political career
With the start of the second term of Cristina Fernández de Kirchner as President of Argentina, Axel Kicillof was appointed Secretary for Economic Policy and Developmental Planning, integrating the organizational chart of officials of the Ministry of Economy and Public Finance of the Nation, which was headed by Hernán Lorenzino.

After that, on 18 November 2013, Kicillof officially became Minister of Economy.

YPF
Kicillof was instrumental in the renationalization of YPF.

President Cristina Fernández de Kirchner named Kicillof to the post of Secretary (or Deputy Minister) for Economic Policy and Development Planning in December 2011. He took academic leave to assume this post. In this position, Kicillof oversaw the controversial 2012 nationalization of YPF, the Argentine oil company then controlled by the Spanish energy firm Repsol. It was the largest expropriation in Argentina's history. He justified this action as part of a needed reversal of the Argentinian economic policies of the 1990s, when the peso had been pegged to the dollar and government assets had been sold off. In connection with his oversight of the seizure of YPF, Kicillof served as a Director of YPF SA starting in June 2012. His power at YPF was equivalent to that of a CFO. He has been called “the ideologue of the expropriation of YPF”

In April 2012, Kicillof told the Argentine Congress that the country would not pay $10 billion in compensation for YPF, as demanded by Repsol. An agreement was ultimately reached with Repsol in November 2013, whereby the latter would be compensated for a 51% stake in YPF with approximately US$5 billion in 10-year corporate bonds.

Minister of Economy

On 18 November 2013, President Cristina Fernández de Kirchner named Kicillof to the post of Minister of Economy. Newsweek reported in July 2014 that Kicillof enjoyed “the full backing of Argentina’s President Cristina Kirchner.” Kicillof, for his part, according to his biographer, “believes Cristina Kirchner is much better than Kirchner.” He is also a close friend of her son, Máximo.

A profile of Kicillof in The New York Times of 26 January 2014, was headlined “The Influential Minister Behind Argentina’s Economic Shift.” According to the Times, Kicillof was leading “a shift in the government’s policies” as Argentina sought “to regain access to global financial markets, following the country’s default on its foreign debt in 2002.” The profile described Kicillof as “mercurial...a scholar with rockabilly-style sideburns and an aversion to business suits,” and said that he was “emerging as the face of policy shifts that are sending tremors through financial markets around the developing world” as well as “wielding greater influence over an array of areas, from Argentina’s oil industry to the government’s attempts to slow capital flight and improve relations with international creditors.” Noting that Kicillof's writings “use Marxist concepts to interpret the work of the British economist John Maynard Keynes,” the Times indicated that Kicillof was seeking to “assert greater state control over Argentina’s economy at a time when growth is slowing significantly and inflation is soaring.”

When Argentina devalued the peso in January 2014, Kicillof placed blame on the exchange-market speculation by Juan José Aranguren, head of Shell; later in the year, when the peso was at its lowest ever position in relation to the dollar, he blamed “vulture funds” from the United States.

El País reported in August 2014 that Kicillof had recently prevailed over the president of the Central Bank, Juan Carlos Fabrega, in two debates, including the question of whether to pay holdout creditors. El País stated that Kicillof had become “one of the most powerful officials” in the Fernández de Kirchner government and that he now not only ran the Ministry of Economy but also wielded considerable influence over other ministries and executive agencies.

Kicillof told the Senate in 2014 that “There is a global consensus that there is no default in Argentina” and that “There is no economic or financial reasons why the dollar is at 15 pesos.”  Nevertheless, international debt-rating agencies such as Standard and Poor's published indications of Argentina's default status.

Debt dispute

Kicillof was a central figure in the 2014 dispute with holdout bondholders, particularly with NML Capital Limited, the Cayman Islands-based hedge fund demanding US$832 million for Argentine bonds purchased for US$49 million in the secondary market in 2008. Argentine debt restructuring initiated in 2005 had been accepted by over 92% of bondholders, and these bonds had been serviced on schedule since then. A 2014 ruling by a District Court Judge Thomas Griesa blocked bondholders' payments for New York-issued bonds. The ruling, which granted holdouts above-market demands, had the contractually-stipulated effect of stopping payments to bondholders until holdout demands were met and in turn led to demands from restructured bondholders (the 92%) that their payments be released.

On 3 July 2014, Newsweek reported that Argentina was “pinning its hopes on the star power and persuasive skills of its young economy minister, Axel Kicillof, to broker an 11th-hour deal.” Noting his refusal to meet with the holdout creditors, who were based in New York, Newsweek stated that “even after a U.S. judge appointed mediator Daniel Pollack to assist Argentina in forging a long-awaited settlement with its unpaid creditors, Kicillof traveled to New York in late June – but only to give an explosive speech at the U.N. lambasting the U.S. courts for driving Argentina’s economy to the brink.” Meanwhile, Kicillof kept the holdout creditors “dangling.” “Even if it was not a deliberate move to tweak Argentina’s inflamed creditors,” stated Newsweek, Kicillof's trip to New York and speech at the U.N. “worked: for the past 30 days, hedge funds such as Elliott have stepped up the urgency of their rhetoric, exhorting Argentina in editorials and emails to the press to come to the negotiating table.”

Later in July, Kicillof led a negotiating team that met with Pollack in New York to try to resolve the dispute with Argentina's holdout creditors. Despite hopes that government representatives would deal directly with the creditors, reported The Wall Street Journal, Kicillof said before the meeting that his delegation would not meet with them, but only with Pollack.

The president of Argentina's Central Bank, Juan Carlos Fábrega, advocated paying off the holdout creditors while Kicillof argued against it. It was Kicillof, reported Business Insider, who persuaded President Fernández de Kirchner to ignore the group of private bankers trying to strike a deal. Kicillof had asked President Fernández de Kirchner to reject a “deal between NML and private bankers — who may have purchased NML's bonds.” He called the deal “a scam with depositors' savings.”

Kicillof represented Argentina at the November 2014 G-20 Summit in Brisbane, Australia, where he called on member nations to adopt measures against vulture funds. The importance of “having sovereign debt process that is orderly and foreseeable” was ultimately adopted as Point 12 in the Brisbane G-20 Summit's 21-point declaration.

In a March 2015 statement, Kicillof contrasted the holdout creditors with “normal creditors" and predicted that other “vulture funds” would materialize and cause further problems for Argentina in the future. Kicillof accused Judge Thomas Griesa, who had ordered Argentina to pay the holdout creditors on their terms, of making “a legal stew” that prevented Argentina from paying other creditors. Griesa's numerous rulings attempting to block bondholder payments were described by Kicillof as “absurd rulings with limited effects.” Citibank Argentina and numerous other banks both within and outside the U.S. had been improperly ordered by Griesa not to pay bondholders, and ultimately had the orders suspended or reversed by Griesa himself.

Criticism
A heterodox economist, Kicillof favors an import substitution model against free trade. He also denies a correlation between the supply of money in the economy with inflation and favor a trade surplus which he associates with better economic performance than a trade deficit. All these fringe positions are largely rejected by mainstream economists.

Kicillof has been criticized for his alleged unwillingness to negotiate. Di Marco of La Nación stated that Kicillof's “economic team” was “anchored in the ideology of TNT economists who believed and believe that the state” should aim to establish a post-capitalist “revolutionary utopia.”

In response to statements by Kicillof that vulture funds were at fault for the devalued Peso, Jorge Lanata observed that Keynes himself, Kicillof's hero, had mocked such analyses in 1923. Lanata wrote that Kicillof, who in 2006 had been “concerned about the deteriorating purchasing power of wages,” was now seemingly unaware that inflation had eroded Argentinians' purchasing power. Argentina has had extremely high levels of inflation during Kicillof's tenure as Economic minister.

Aerolíneas Argentinas
In June 2014, federal prosecutor Eduardo Taiano charged Kicillof with irregularities in the management of funds for the airport regulatory agency (ORSNA) while he was director of Aerolíneas Argentinas. Taiano was also investigating the airline's president, Mariano Recalde, saying that the two men had practiced systematic misappropriation. The charges were not admitted in court.

Latam and IT scandals
In October 2014, Kicillof was denounced for his purported links with the Latam Securities Investment Fund (Latam). According to journalist Marcelo Bonelli, Kicillof, through his deputy, Emanuel Álvarez Agis, had ordered the Central Bank to give Latam special treatment. Because of this directive, Latam was able to purchase 200-300 million dollars in bonds directly from the Central Bank. Bonelli noted that Kicillof had close ties to Diego Marynberg of Latam, and that Álvarez Agis had close ties to UBS Investment Bank official Jorge Pepa, who handled the Latam transaction while at UBS and who, some months later, was hired by Marynberg at Latam.

On 10 March 2015, La Nación reported that Kicillof had been “accused of 'occupational fraud' in his own ministry.” Some 200 students who had IT jobs in the Ministry of Economy and who were being paid through their university had published a petition online accusing Kicillof of giving them “precarious” positions and said that within a few days they would issue a court injunction against him.

The Believer
Kicillof is the subject of a 2012 book, El Creyente: ¿Quién es Axel Kicillof? (The Believer: Who Is Axel Kicillof?), by Ezequiel Burgo, who has described him as “the strongest Economy Minister Argentina has had in a decade”. According to Burgo, Kicillof “blindly believes in the economic policy that he transmits to the President.” His dream, Burgo has said, “is to lead Argentina's economy, plan it, mold it to his liking.”

Prosecution
As of November 2016, Kicillof had been indicted and charged in federal criminal court for his role in the "Future Dollar" controversy, in which Kicillof allegedly participated in a Central Bank scheme to sell US$10 billion value in future dollar contracts, while the charges indicate that those futures were actually worth US$15 billion. Kicillof was acquitted for absence of crime by the Federal Chamber of Criminal Appeals on 13 April 2021.

Publications
Kicillof has published articles, both alone and in collaboration in a number of general publications, such as Clarín, La Nación, and Le Monde Diplomatique (Bolivian edition).

Books
Fundamentos de la Teoría General. Las consecuencias teóricas de Lord Keynes. [Fundamentals of the General Theory. The theoretical consequences of Lord Keynes.] Buenos Aires, EUDEBA, Buenos Aires, 2008.

Scholarly articles
Kicillof has contributed many articles, both alone and in collaboration, to such economic journals as Realidad Económica, II Encontro InterNaciónal da Associação Keynesiana Brasileira, Desarrollo económico - revista de ciencias sociales, I Jornada de Economía Política de la Universidad Nacional de General Sarmiento, I Jornadas de Economía Crítica, Capital and Class, and Jornadas de Epistemología de las Ciencias Económicas.
De Smith a Keynes: siete lecciones de Historia del Pensamiento Económico. Un análisis de las obras originales. [From Smith to Keynes: Seven historical lessons in economic thought. An analysis of the original works.] Buenos Aires, EUDEBA, 2010.
La macroeconomía después de la Convertibilidad. In CENDA, La anatomía del nuevo patrón de crecimiento y la encrucijada actual. La economía argentina período 2002-2010, Ed. Atuel. Buenos Aires, Colección Cara o Ceca, 2010. Co-authored with Agis, E.; Girard, C.; and Marongiu, F.

Personal life
Kicillof is married to Soledad Quereilhac, a professor of literature at the University of Buenos Aires and the author of a 2014 book, La imaginación científica. Ciencias ocultas y literatura fantástica en el Buenos Aires de entre-siglos (1875-1910) (The Scientific Imagination: occult sciences and fantasy literature in turn-of-the-century Buenos Aires (1875-1910)). They live in the Buenos Aires neighborhood of Parque Chas and have two children.

He speaks English and French fluently. His younger sister, Irene, is a psychologist and translator. His older brother, Nicolás, is a software engineer living in New York City.

Laura Di Marco wrote in La Nación in November 2013 that Kicillof “is the son Cristina [Fernández de Kirchner] would have liked” Newsweek reported in July 2014 that Kicillof enjoyed “the full backing of Argentina’s President Cristina Kirchner.” Kicillof, for his part, according to his biographer, “believes Cristina Kirchner is much better than Kirchner.” He also became a close friend of her son, Máximo.

Axel Kicillof supported the legalization of abortion and urged his colleagues of the Justicialista Party to "give women the right to decide about their bodies."

Electoral history

Executive

Legislative

References

External links
 CV of Axel Kicillof

|-

1971 births
Living people
Argentine economists
Argentine Jews
Jewish economists
Argentine Ministers of Finance
Argentine people of German-Jewish descent
Argentine people of Ukrainian-Jewish descent
Governors of Buenos Aires Province
Jewish Argentine politicians
Marxian economists
People from Buenos Aires
University of Buenos Aires alumni
Academic staff of the University of Buenos Aires
Justicialist Party politicians
Members of the Argentine Chamber of Deputies elected in Buenos Aires